William Townshend may refer to:

William Townshend (MP) (1702–1738), British MP
William Townshend (colonial governor) (c. 1745–1816), acting governor of Prince Edward Island
William Townshend (cricketer) (1849–1923), English cricketer

See also
William Townsend (disambiguation)